

League Standings
                           GP   W   L    PCT   GB     GF    GA  Home  Road
     
 San Diego Sockers         24  14  10   .583  ----   133   114   8-4   6-6
 Dallas Sidekicks          24  14  10   .583  ----   109   108   9-3   5-7
 Sacramento Knights        24  11  13   .458   3.0   122   132   9-3  2-10
 St. Louis Steamers        24  11  13   .458   3.0   123   125   7-5   4-8
 Utah Freezz               24  10  14   .417   4.0   113   121   7-5   3-9

 Playoffs
 Semi-Finals               Dallas defeated Sacramento 2-1,5-4(OT)
                           San Diego defeated St. Louis 7-5,0-1,4-0
 CHAMPIONSHIP:            Dallas defeated San Diego 6-3,3-5,2-1(OT)

Scoring leaders

GP = Games Played, G = Goals, A = Assists, Pts = Points

League awards
Most Valuable Player: Ato Leone, Sacramento
                            
Defender of the Year: Iain Fraser, Sacramento

Rookie of the Year: David Beltran, San Diego

Goalkeeper of the Year: Sagu, Dallas

Coach of the Year: Iain Fraser, Sacramento

All-WISL Teams

https://www.indoorsoccerhall.com/awards

World Indoor Soccer League